Blue Bayou Waterpark and Dixie Landin' are adjacent amusement parks in Baton Rouge, Louisiana.  Blue Bayou is a water park and Dixie Landin' is a dry amusement park with thrill rides.

Blue Bayou

Blue Bayou has 20 attractions including a lazy river, a behemoth bowl, a quadruple aqualoop, a wave pool, a ProSlide Tornado, and many other slides. Over the years, it has been adding new attractions. The newest attraction is "Mambo", a quadruple aqualoop which opened in August 2012. For the 2012 season, it also updated its lazy river, bathhouses, food menus, and kids' section. It is marketed as "The Land of the Giants", with the park advertising five of its water slides as the world's largest of their types.

Attractions
Mambo (World's Largest Aqualoop)
Voodoo (World's Largest Dark Behemothbowl)
Azuka (World's Largest Tornado Slide)
Racers (World's Largest Water Racer)
Conja' (World's Largest In-Line Water Slide)
Mad Moccasins
Pirate's Cove (A Children's Play Area)
Flyin' Pirogue 
High Water
Awesome Twosome
Hurricane Bay (Wave pool)
Lafitte's Plunge (A 90 Foot Free Fall Slide)
Atchafalaya Run (formerly Lazy River)

Dixie Landin'

Dixie Landin' was built in 1999. Some of its rides came from the now defunct Fun Fair Park which was located at the intersection of Florida Boulevard and Airline Highway. It includes rides for all ages, including kiddie rides and thrill seeker rides. It currently has 27 attractions, including an S&S combo drop tower, a log flume, three roller coasters, and a variety of flat rides. The Drop Tower, Hot Shot, was originally the O2 Tower from Panama City Beach, Florida's now defunct Miracle Strip Amusement Park. In 2008, Hurricane Gustav destroyed the Coca-Cola concert stage, however, a new one was built in time for the 2009 season.

Roller coasters

Amusement rides

Incidents
On June 9, 2006, a 2-year-old boy broke his arms and legs after falling at least  from the “Over the Rainbow” ride.

On July 11, 2010, around 4:00 p.m., a woman fell to her death from the now-defunct Xtreme roller coaster.

On August 4, 2011, Blue Bayou and Dixie Landin' was fined $25,295 by the U.S. Department of Labor for numerous labor violations. The park was allowing minors to work more than eight hours a day. 49 minors in the 14- to 15-year-old category were found to be subject to child labor provision violations.

Hurricane Gustav 
Hurricane Gustav caused moderate damage to both parks on September 1, 2008. Many trees were snapped, blown over, or uprooted. The Coca-Cola stage was destroyed, the awnings were blown off the Azuka, a portion of the Pirate's Cove roof was blown off, and a storage building alongside the Lazy River had its metal chimney knocked down onto the roof (it still remains lying on the roof, and was actually damaged again by Hurricane Isaac in 2012); the storage building contains the Lazy River's water flow pump. Multiple other attractions and buildings were affected. Luckily for Blue Bayou/Dixie Landin', the parks had just ended their season when the storm struck. They reopened in time for the 2009 season.

References

http://rcdb.com/4738.htm

http://theadvocate.com/news/410197-64/council-committee-discuss-bond-plan.html

External links
Blue Bayou.com
Dixie Landin'.com

Amusement parks in Louisiana
Buildings and structures in Baton Rouge, Louisiana
Tourist attractions in Baton Rouge, Louisiana
1989 establishments in Louisiana
Amusement parks opened in 1989